Toshizō is a masculine Japanese given name.

Possible writings
Toshizō can be written using different combinations of kanji characters. Here are some examples:

敏三, "agile, three"
敏蔵, "agile, store up"
敏造, "agile, store up"
俊三, "talented, three"
俊蔵, "talented, store up"
俊造, "talented, create"
利三, "benefit, three"
利蔵, "benefit, store up"
利造, "benefit, create"
寿三, "long life, three"
寿蔵, "long life, store up"
寿造, "long life, create"
年三, "year, three"
年蔵, "year, store up"
年造, "year, create"
歳三, "age, three"

The name can also be written in hiragana としぞう or katakana トシゾウ.

Notable people with the name
Toshizo Hijikata (土方 歳三, 1835–1869), Japanese swordsman and Shinsengumi commander.
Toshizo Ido (井戸 敏三, born 1945), Japanese politician.
Toshizo Nishio (西尾 寿造, 1881–1960), Japanese general.

Japanese masculine given names